The Security Printing & Minting Corporation of India Ltd. (SPMCIL) is a company under the Department of Economic Affairs, a department under the Ministry of Finance. It is responsible for conducting  printing and minting activities of the Government of India. It is under the ownership of the Ministry of Finance, Government of India. It was incorporated on 13 January 2006 with its registered office at New Delhi. It is engaged in the manufacture / production of currency and banknotes, security paper, non-judicial stamp papers, postage stamps and stationery, travel document viz., passport and visa, security certificates, cheques, bonds, warrants, special certificates with security features, security inks, circulation and commemorative coins, medallions, refining of gold, silver and assay of precious metals, etc.

The corporation was formed in 2006 as the result of nationalisation of security presses and mints functioning under the Ministry of Finance. It contains nine units, four mints, four presses and a paper mill.

History 
The corporation was incorporated by taking over two security presses at Nashik and Hyderabad, two currency note presses at Dewas and Nashik, four mints at Mumbai, Kolkata, Hyderabad and Noida and one security paper mill at Narmadapuram which were working under the direct administrative control of the Ministry of Finance and the Department of Economic Affairs. The Expenditure Reforms Commission in its third report dated 23 December 2000 gave a set of nine recommendations concerning mints and presses and suggested the exploration of the option of placing India Security Press, Nashik and four India Government Mints under a corporate body. The commission also recommended the government to explore the feasibility of the Department of Posts taking over the Security Printing Press at Hyderabad. The Commission further recommended for the two currency note presses at Dewas and Nashik to be transferred to the control of Bharatiya Reserve Bank Note Mundran Private Limited, setting up of a new security paper mill by the Reserve Bank of India (RBI) and phasing out or privatization of Security Paper Mill, Narmadapuram.

Neither the RBI nor the Department of Posts agreed to take over the security presses as per the recommendations of the Expenditure Reforms Commission. The feasibility of hiving off the security paper mill at Hoshangabad could not fructify due to operational and logistic constraints. On subsequent review of functions and performance of the Units, it was realized that the main constraints in the existing system of keeping these units as government entities were low productivity, obsolete technology, outdated financial systems and procedures, besides delay in responding technologically to the challenges of counterfeiting. All these factors, in combination, were resulting in inefficient capacity utilization and consequential higher cost of production.

Corporatisation 
In view of the above, the Industrial Finance Corporation of India (IFCI) Limited was appointed as consultant to study the working of the nine units and present a feasibility report for their corporatisation. Accordingly, it was decided to form a wholly owned corporation by taking over all the nine security presses/mints/security paper mill. The Union Cabinet in its meeting held on 2 September 2005 approved the formation of a wholly owned corporation, namely, the Security Printing and Minting Corporation of India Limited (SPMCIL). The corporation was incorporated under the Companies Act on 13 January 2006. Following the corporatisation of the India Security Press and the four India Government Mints on 10 February 2006.

Organisation structure 

SPMCIL is headed by a board of directors, presided by the chairman and managing director. The other board members include three functional directors who head the departments of technology, finance and human resource. Apart from the four functional directors, two independent directors are nominated by the Ministry of Finance and one by the Ministry of External Affairs. The board also commissions a Chief Vigilance Officer (CVO) who heads the organisation's internal vigilance department. His functional responsibilities include managing production planning, maintenance, technology, R&D, logistics, procurement and marketing. Every individual unit is headed by a Chief General Manager who functions under the control and directions of the head office.

Human resource 
The Human Resource Department handles administration, establishment, legal matters, training, personnel and industry relations.

Finance department 
The finance department handles accounts, taxation, internal audits, costing, budgeting, capital investments corporate finance, co-ordination with auditors, systems and co-ordination, company secretariat etc.

Units 
According to the information made available, SPMCIL broadly operates through four production verticals i.e. currency printing presses, security printing presses, security paper mill and India Government mints.

Currency printing presses 
SPMCIL consists of two currency printing presses: the Currency Note Press (CNP) in Nashik and the Bank Note Press (BNP) in Dewas. New production lines are also set up in Mysore and Salboni. The two units are engaged in production of bank notes for India as well as a few foreign countries including Iraq, Nepal, Sri Lanka, Myanmar and Bhutan. More than 40% of Currency Notes circulated in India are printed by the two units. These units are equipped with designing, engraving, complete Pre-printing and Offset facilities, Intaglio Printing machines, Numbering & Finishing machinesetc.

It is established in 1928 as the first printing press for bank notes in India. They are currently responsible for the printing of the new 500 rupee notes following the demonetisation of the old 500 rupee and 1000 rupee note. Currency is also printed by the two presses of Bharatiya Reserve Bank Note Mudran Private Limited, a wholly owned subsidiary of Reserve Bank of India. They are currently responsible for the printing of the new 2000 rupee notes, and speculations suggest that the printing of the 500 rupee notes will also shift to these presses for better speed and fewer errors. BNP also has an ink factory that produces ink for security printing.

Security printing presses 
There are two Security printing presses of SPMCIL, namely the India Security Press (ISP) at Nashik and Security Printing Press (SPP) at Hyderabad. These presses print the 100% requirement of passports and other travel documents, non-judicial stamp papers, cheques, bonds, warrants, postal stamps and postal stationery and other security products. The Security Printing Presses have the capability of incorporating security features like chemically reactive elements, various Guilloche patterns, micro lettering, designs with UV inks, bi-fluorescent inks, optical variable inks, micro perforation, adhesive/glue, embossing, die-cutting and personalization, etc.

Mints 
SPMCIL comprises four units of India Government Mint located in the cities of Mumbai, Kolkata, Hyderabad and Noida. These mints produce circulation coins, commemorative coins, medallions and bullion, as required by the Government of India.

Paper mill 
Security Paper Mill was established in 1968 at Hoshangabad, Madhya Pradesh. It produces papers for banknotes and non–judicial stamps and further prints with new enhanced unit.

References

External links 
 Security Printing and Minting Corporation of India Limited (SPMCIL)
 Bank Note Paper Mill India Private Limited(BNPM)

Government-owned companies of India
Manufacturing companies established in 2006
Manufacturing companies based in Delhi
Companies based in New Delhi
Banknote printing companies
2006 establishments in Delhi
Indian companies established in 2006